Lombadan-e Balai (also Romanized as Lombadān-e Bālā’ī and Lombadān Bālā’ī; also known as Lombadān-e Majīd (Persian: لمبدان مجيد), Lombadān ‘Olyā, Lombadān Seyyed, Lompehdān, and Lompehdān-e Majīd) is a village in Howmeh Rural District of the Central District of Deyr County, Bushehr province, Iran. At the 2006 census, its population was 1,069 in 209 households. The following census in 2011 counted 1,176 people in 287 households. The latest census in 2016 showed a population of 1,256 people in 321 households; it was the largest village in its rural district.

References 

Populated places in Deyr County